Daniela Diaz (born 16 June 1982) is a Swiss ice hockey coach and former player. She coached the Swiss national team at the 2017 IIHF Women's World Championship.

Her brother Raphael Diaz is also a hockey player.

References

External links

1982 births
Living people
Swiss ice hockey coaches
Swiss women's ice hockey forwards
People from Baar, Switzerland
Sportspeople from the canton of Zug
Olympic ice hockey players of Switzerland
Ice hockey players at the 2006 Winter Olympics
21st-century Swiss women